Edith McClafferty (born 1960) is a Democratic member of the Montana Senate district 38 and has served in this capacity since 2017. Previously, she served as a member of the Montana Legislature from 2009 to 2016 for the 75th district. She currently serves as the Vice Chair of the Montana Senate Education Committee.

References

Living people
1960 births
Democratic Party members of the Montana House of Representatives
Democratic Party Montana state senators
Politicians from Butte, Montana
Women state legislators in Montana
21st-century American politicians
21st-century American women politicians